The Favela Rocks are a group of rocks at the northwest end of the Phillips Mountains,  northwest of Mount June, in the Ford Ranges of Marie Byrd Land, Antarctica. They were mapped by the United States Geological Survey from surveys and U.S. Navy air photos (1959–65), and were named by the Advisory Committee on Antarctic Names for Rafael Favela, Jr., U.S. Navy, an equipment operator in the Byrd Station winter party, 1967.

References 

Rock formations of Marie Byrd Land